Kenneth Brian Edmonds (born April 10, 1959), better known by his stage name Babyface, is an American singer, songwriter, and record producer. He has written and produced over 26 number-one R&B hits throughout his career and has won 12 Grammy Awards. He was ranked number 20 on NME 50 of The Greatest Producers Ever list.

Early life
Edmonds was born on April 10, 1959, in Indianapolis, Indiana, to Marvin and Barbara Edmonds. Barbara was a production operator at a pharmaceutical plant. Edmonds, who is the fifth of six brothers (including future After 7 band members Melvin and Kevon Edmonds, the latter of whom went on to have a modestly successful solo career), attended North Central High School in Indianapolis, and as a shy youth, wrote songs to express his emotions. When he was in eighth grade, Edmonds' father died of lung cancer, leaving his mother to raise her sons alone.

Music career
Edmonds later met funk performer Bootsy Collins, who tagged him "Babyface" because of his youthful look. He also performed in the group Manchild (which had a 1977 hit "Especially for You" with band member Daryl Simmons) as a guitarist.  He played keyboards and guitar in the light-funk and R&B group the Deele (which also included drummer Antonio "L.A." Reid, with whom he would later form a successful writing and producing partnership). One of his first major credits as a songwriter for outside artists came when he wrote the tune "Slow Jam" for the R&B band Midnight Star in 1983. The tune was on Midnight Star's 1983 double-platinum No Parking on the Dance Floor album. Babyface remained in the Deele until 1988, when both he and Reid left the group.

His album Playlist consists of eight cover songs and two original works. It was released on September 18, 2007. It was the first album on the newly re-launched Mercury Records label.

On February 4, 2014, he released a Grammy Award-winning duet album with Toni Braxton titled Love, Marriage & Divorce on Motown Records.

Other ventures

Writing and producing
From the late 1980s to the early 90s, he wrote R&B and dance songs, writing and producing music for Bobby Brown ("Roni"), Karyn White ("Love Saw It"), Pebbles ("Girlfriend", "Mercedes Boy"), The Whispers ("Rock Steady", "In the Mood"), The Deele ("Two Occasions"), Johnny Gill ("My My My"), After 7 ("Ready or Not"), The Boys ("Dial My Heart"), Damian Dame ("Right Down to It") and Sheena Easton.

In 1989, Edmonds co-founded LaFace Records with Reid. Three of the label's early artists, TLC, Usher, and Toni Braxton, were very successful. TLC's second album CrazySexyCool, for which he wrote and produced some of the hits, became the best-selling album of all time by an American girl group. Under his direction, TLC sold more than 60 million albums worldwide, and a combined total of 75 million records. Toni Braxton's first two albums, Toni Braxton (1993) and Secrets (1996), for which he wrote the majority of the songs, went on to sell a combined total of over 10 million copies in America alone.

Babyface helped form the popular late-1990s R&B group Az Yet. Edmonds also helped to mold and work with some of his then-wife Tracey Edmonds' acts, such as Jon B and producer Jon-John Robinson.

Edmonds has worked with many successful performers in contemporary music. "I'm Your Baby Tonight" (1990), produced for Whitney Houston, was Houston's introduction to R&B music and Edmonds' first No. 1 Top 40 hit in the US. He also wrote and produced Boyz II Men's 1992 "End of the Road" and 1994 "I'll Make Love to You", both of which established records for the longest stay at No. 1 on the Billboard Hot 100 chart. He co-wrote, co-produced, and provided backing vocals on Madonna's 1994 Bedtime Stories, which featured the seven-week No. 1 hit "Take a Bow", and shared billing with Eric Clapton on the chart-topping Grammy winner "Change the World" from the Phenomenon soundtrack. He also wrote and produced the No. 1 hit "Exhale (Shoop Shoop)" for Houston as well as the rest of the critically acclaimed 10 million-selling Waiting to Exhale soundtrack in 1995, which spawned additional hits for Houston, Brandy and Mary J. Blige.

Additionally, Edmonds has produced and written music for many artists including Bobby Brown, The Whispers, Pebbles, After 7, Johnny Gill, Deele, Karyn White, The Boys, Damian Dame, Tevin Campbell, Patti LaBelle, Chaka Khan, Aretha Franklin, Madonna, Janet Jackson, Faith Evans, Beyoncé, Diana Ross, Sheena Easton, Toni Braxton, Michael Jackson, Michael Bolton, Paula Abdul, Eric Clapton ("Change the World"), Whitney Houston, Brandy, Mary J. Blige, Tamia, Shola Ama, 3T, Sisqó, Dru Hill, Fall Out Boy, Céline Dion, Samantha Jade, Backstreet Boys, Honeyz, Katharine McPhee, Mariah Carey, Vanessa L. Williams, Bruno Mars, Kelly Clarkson, Chanté Moore, En Vogue, Zendaya, Kenny G, Kristinia DeBarge, Lil Wayne, Kevin Abstract, P!nk, Marc Nelson, TLC, Ariana Grande, Jessica Mauboy, Xscape, K-Ci & JoJo, NSYNC, Jordin Sparks and Phil Collins, among others. He received three consecutive Grammy Awards for Producer of the Year from 1996 to 1998.

Babyface was in the studio for about two years with Ashanti to produce her album The Declaration (2008).

He worked on the Lil Wayne album Tha Carter III (2008), on the Kanye West-produced "Comfortable". He also worked with R&B singer Monica for her sixth studio album Still Standing (2010).

In 2013, Babyface served as producer for Ariana Grande's debut album Yours Truly, producing the majority of her songs, including her second single, "Baby I".

In September 2014, Babyface collaborated with Barbra Streisand on her album Partners, performing a duet on the track "Evergreen" and background vocals for other album tracks.

Babyface also collaborated with Foxes on her second album, All I Need (2016), producing and co-writing "Scar".

In July 2016, Babyface along with Bruce Roberts and Carole Bayer Sager helped write the song "Stronger Together" sung by Jessica Sanchez. The song was played after Hillary Clinton's speech at the 2016 Democratic National Convention. The song's title is named after the slogan that the Clinton campaign used as a show of uniting behind the Democratic nominee. The song was one of the top trending songs on Shazam that week. The song was widely perceived as positive by the listeners, and received praise by celebrities like Jennifer Lopez and Kim Kardashian.

Acting
In 1994, he appeared and performed on an episode of Beverly Hills, 90210, entitled "Mr. Walsh Goes to Washington (Part 2)".

In the mid-1990s, Edmonds and his then-wife Tracey Edmonds expanded into the business of motion pictures. Upon setting up Edmonds Entertainment Group, the company producing films such as Soul Food (1997), Josie and the Pussycats (2001), and also the soundtrack for the film The Prince of Egypt (1998), which included contributions from numerous artists, including Mariah Carey and Whitney Houston. They also executive produced the BET reality series College Hill (2004-2009). Edmonds also worked with David Foster to compose "The Power of the Dream", the official song of the 1996 Summer Olympics, performed by superstar Céline Dion. Linda Thompson provided the lyrics.

Babyface also participated as a duet partner on the Fox reality show Celebrity Duets (2006).

He was portrayed by Wesley Jonathan in the 2015 Lifetime biopic Whitney and is portrayed by actor Gavin Houston in the Lifetime biopic based on Toni Braxton entitled Un-Break My Heart, which premiered on the network in early 2016.

In 2016, Babyface competed on season 23 of Dancing with the Stars. He was partnered with professional dancer Allison Holker. He and Holker were eliminated on the fourth week of competition and finished in 11th place along with Vanilla Ice and Witney Carson.

Soda Pop Records
Edmonds founded his record label Soda Pop Records in 2009. Since founding the label he has signed R&B icons K-Ci & JoJo, releasing their first album for the label entitled My Brother's Keeper. In 2013 Babyface secured a distribution deal with E1 Music for the label.

Personal life

In 1990, Babyface met Tracey McQuarn when she auditioned for the music video for his song "Whip Appeal". They married on September 5, 1992, and have two sons, Brandon and Dylan. On January 7, 2005, Tracey filed for divorce in Los Angeles County Superior Court, citing irreconcilable differences. In October 2005, Babyface and Tracey announced that they were ending their marriage of thirteen years.

In 2007, Babyface began dating his backup dancer Nicole "Nikki" Pantenburg (former backup dancer for and personal friend of Janet Jackson). Babyface and Pantenburg have a daughter, Payton, born in 2008. The pair married on May 17, 2014. In July 2021, they announced that their marriage would be ending after seven years.

Impact
In 1999, a 25-mile (40 km) stretch of Interstate 65 that runs through Indianapolis was renamed the Kenneth "Babyface" Edmonds Highway.

Babyface was placed at number 20 on NME "50 of the Greatest Producers Ever" list. NME wrote of his impact:

Discography

Studio albums
 Lovers (1986)
 Tender Lover (1989)
 For the Cool in You (1993)
 The Day (1996)
 Face2Face (2001)
 Grown & Sexy (2005)
 Playlist (2007)
 Return of the Tender Lover (2015)
 Girls Night Out (2022)

Collaboration albums
 Power and Love with Manchild (1977) 
 Feel the Phuff with Manchild (1978) 
 Street Beat with The Deele (1983) 
 Material Thangz with The Deele (1985) 
 Eyes of a Stranger with The Deele (1987) 
 Love, Marriage & Divorce with Toni Braxton (2014)

Accolades
In 1999, Babyface received the Golden Plate Award of the American Academy of Achievement presented by Awards Council member Coretta Scott King at a ceremony in Washington, D.C.

On August 30, 2006, Babyface was honored as a BMI Icon at the 6th annual BMI Urban Awards. Throughout his career, Babyface has won the BMI Pop Songwriter of the Year trophy seven times and a total of 51 BMI Awards, which includes Song of the Year for his Toni Braxton hit, "Breathe Again", in 1994.

Babyface was honored with the 2,508th star of the Hollywood Walk of Fame on October 10, 2013. The star is located at 6270 Hollywood Boulevard.

On October 18, 2018, he was conferred with an honorary doctorate degree from Indiana University Bloomington in recognition of his illustrious career in music.

Grammy Awards

References

External links

Babyface at Bmi.com

 
1958 births
African-American record producers
Record producers from Indiana
African-American male singer-songwriters
Def Jam Recordings artists
Grammy Award winners
Island Records artists
Living people
Musicians from Indianapolis
SOLAR Records artists
Sony Music Publishing artists
American contemporary R&B singers
New jack swing musicians
Singer-songwriters from Indiana